Jianshi may refer to:

Locations
Jianshi County, in Enshi, Hubei, China
Jianshi, Hunan (剪市), a town in Taoyuan County, Hunan, China
Jianshi, Hsinchu, a town in Hsinchu County, Taiwan
Jianshi, Wanquan in Wanquan, Honghu, Jingzhou, Hubei, China

Historical eras
Jianshi (32BC–28BC), era name used by Emperor Cheng of Han
Jianshi (25–27), era name used by Liu Penzi, emperor of the Han dynasty
Jianshi (301), era name used by Sima Lun, emperor of the Jin dynasty
Jianshi (407), era name used by Murong Xi, emperor of Later Yan

See also
 Jiangshi, a type of reanimated corpse in Chinese legends and folklore